Sir Roland Bowdler Lomax Vaughan Williams (31 December 1838 – 8 December 1916) was an English lawyer and judge. From 1897 to 1914 he was a Lord Justice of the Court of Appeal. He was an authority on the laws of bankruptcy, and wrote a book that remained the standard English work on the subject for many years.

Life and career
Vaughan Williams was born in Kensington, London, the fifth son of the judge Sir Edward Vaughan Williams and his wife, Jane Margaret, née Bagot. Among his brothers was Arthur, who became a clergyman and was the father of the composer Ralph Vaughan Williams. He was educated at the Westminster School and Christ Church, Oxford, graduating in the year 1860.

Vaughan Williams was called to the bar in 1861 and was a barrister of Lincoln's Inn.  In 1870 he published The Law and Practice of Bankruptcy, a work that  was for many years the standard English authority on the subject. He became a Queen's Counsel in 1889.

The following year he was raised to the bench as a Judge of the Queen's Bench Division, from which he was promoted to be a Lord Justice of the Court of Appeal  in 1897; he was appointed to the Privy Council at the same time. In 1906 he was appointed chairman of the Royal Commission on the disestablishment of the Church in Wales; the success of the commission and the smooth implementation of its recommendations were largely attributable to him.

In 1865 he married Laura Susannah, daughter of Edmund Lomax of Surrey after which he added her surname to his own. They had one son who survived to adulthood and two who did not.

Vaughan Williams died at his home in Abinger, Surrey, at the age of 77.

Notable cases

High Court
 Re Anglo-Austrian Printing & Publishing Union [1895] 2 Ch 891, concerning recovery of assets under a misfeasance action

Court of Appeal
Re Peveril Gold Mines Ltd [1898] 1 Ch 122, regarding the power of a shareholder to wind-up an insolvent company
Allen v Gold Reefs of West Africa Ltd [1900] 1 Ch 656 (dissenting), on amendments to the articles of association which were not in the interests of the company as a whole
Krell v Henry [1903] 2 KB 740, one of the "Coronation cases" relating to frustration of purpose under contract law
Re Yorkshire Woolcombers Association Ltd [1903] 2 Ch 295, arguably his most famous judicial contribution, formulating the description of a floating charge
 Re Atkinson [1904] 2 Ch 160, on apportioning entitlements between a life tenant and remainderman in a trust
Hirachand Punumchand v Temple [1911] 2 KB 330, relating to part payment of debts
Chaplin v Hicks [1911] 2 KB 786, on damages for loss of chance

Notes

1838 births
1916 deaths
English barristers
20th-century English judges
Members of the Privy Council of the United Kingdom
Alumni of Christ Church, Oxford
People educated at Westminster School, London
Knights Bachelor
Lords Justices of Appeal
Queen's Bench Division judges
English King's Counsel
19th-century King's Counsel
Members of Lincoln's Inn
19th-century English judges